The Ministerial and Other Salaries Act 1975 is an Act of the Parliament of the United Kingdom that governs the salaries of ministerial and certain other political offices in the UK.

In 2003, a joint public bill committee deemed the Act one of "the fundamental parts of constitutional law..."

Salaries 
The Act also sets out the salaries of government ministers, government whips, opposition leaders and whips and the speakers of the two houses of Parliament, as set out below:

Government ministers

Government whips

Opposition leaders and whips

Speakers in the House of Commons and the House of Lords

Limits
The Act explicitly imposes numerical limits over one on the following ministerial salaries:

The Act also explicitly imposes the following limit over one:

See also
 House of Commons Disqualification Act 1975

Notes

References

External links
 House of Commons Information Office Factsheet on Ministerial Salaries
 House of Commons Library Standard Note on Limitations on the number of Ministers and the size of the Payroll vote
Limitations on the number of Ministers
 Ministerial and other Salaries Act 1975

United Kingdom Acts of Parliament 1975
Constitutional laws of the United Kingdom
Acts of the Parliament of the United Kingdom concerning the House of Commons